Dan Smith may refer to:

Entertainment
 Dan Smith (artist) (20th–21st century), American illustrator
 Dan Smith (singer) (born 1986), British vocalist for the band Bastille
 Dan Smith (21st century), American vocalist for Listener
 Dan Smith (21st century), British guitarist for Noisettes
 Dan Smith, founder of the rock band The Dear & Departed

Sports
 Dan Smith (rugby union) (1869–1926), South African rugby union player
 Dan Smith (minor league pitcher) (born 1962), College World Series Most Outstanding Player
 Dan Smith (left-handed pitcher) (born 1969), Major League Baseball pitcher
 Dan Smith (right-handed pitcher) (born 1975), Major League Baseball pitcher
 Dan Smith (ice hockey) (born 1976), Canadian ice hockey player
 Dan Smith (footballer, born 1986), English footballer
 Dan Smith (footballer, born 1989), English footballer
 Dan Smith (footballer, born 1999), English footballer
 Dan Smith (poker player) (born 1989), American professional poker player

Other
 T. Dan Smith (1915–1993), English politician from Newcastle upon Tyne
 Dan Smith (British author) (born 1951), British political activist

See also
 Dan Ward-Smith (born 1978), rugby player
 Daniel Smith (disambiguation)
 Danny Smith (disambiguation)